Syrya is a rural locality (a village) in Chekuyevskoye Rural Settlement of Onezhsky District, Arkhangelsk Oblast, Russia. The population was 25 as of 2010.

Geography 
Syrya is located 77 km southeast of Onega (the district's administrative centre) by road. Bolshoy Bor is the nearest rural locality.

References 

Rural localities in Onezhsky District